Jordan Howard Sobel (22 September 1929 – 26 March 2010) was a Canadian-American philosopher specializing in ethics, logic, and decision theory. He was a professor of philosophy at the University of Toronto, Canada. In addition to his areas of specialization, Sobel made notable contributions in the fields of philosophy of religion, and value theory. Before his death, Sobel was considered the leading philosophical defender of Atheism prior to Graham Oppy.

Life
Born and raised in Chicago, Illinois, Sobel was a graduate of Hyde Park High School in Chicago before going on to study at the University of Illinois, where he earned a B.S. in Commerce and Law in 1951. He went on to earn an M.A. in Philosophy at the University of Iowa, followed by a doctorate in Philosophy at the University of Michigan in 1961. His dissertation, titled "What if everyone did that?" was supervised by Richard Cartwright and William Frankena.

Teaching
Sobel's teaching career starting at Monteith College, Wayne State University (1960–1961), before holding positions at Princeton University (1961–1963), UCLA (1963–1969), University of Massachusetts, Amherst (1968–1969). The same year he joined the University of Toronto, where he taught for 28 years until his retirement in 1997.

Sobel has enjoyed a close relationship with the University of Uppsala, Sweden, holding two visiting professorships in 1986, 1991, 1997–1998, and then onwards until 2004. In 2003, the University of Uppsala bestowed an honorary doctorate on Sobel. He also held visiting professorships at Dalhousie University in 1988, and the University of Umeå in 1995.

Work
Sobel is the author of more than 75 refereed publications in philosophy, as well as four books. His early publications focused on ethics, most notably utilitarianism, and determinism. Later in his career, his interests turned to decision theory and philosophy of religion.

Logic and Theism 
In 2004, Sobel published what many consider to be his magnum opus: Logic and Theism: Arguments For and Against Beliefs in God. The work is a comprehensive overview of many of the arguments on both sides within analytic philosophy of religion. Sobel utilizes symbolic logic, inductive logic, set theory and other tools within analytic philosophy to critically analyze cosmological arguments, ontological arguments, teleological arguments and other arguments for God's existence. Sobel also reformulates a new sound version of the logical problem of evil, and reveals tension between God's divine attributes. The work was extremely well-received by philosophers on both sides of the debate. Atheist philosopher Graham Oppy stated that the work is the "very best book on arguments about the existence of God that has yet appeared." Catholic philosopher Robert Koons described the work as the best book on philosophy of religion written from an atheistic point of view since J. L. Mackie’s The Miracle of Theism. Protestant philosopher William Lane Craig describes the work as an "acid bath for theism" and writes "I can think of no other treatment of theism, whether by theist or non-theist, comparable to it. Its combination of wide-ranging scope and penetrating analysis makes it a unique contribution to philosophical theology. The product of a lifetime of study, Logic and Theism is testimony to Howard Sobel’s remarkable mastery of this subject, for very few contemporary philosophers could have written so comprehensive and incisive a treatment."

Books
 Taking Chances: Essays on Rational Choice, Cambridge University Press (1994) 
 Puzzles for the Will, University of Toronto Press (1998) 
 Logic and Theism: Arguments for and against Beliefs in God, Cambridge University Press (2004) 
 Walls and Vaults: A Natural Science of Morals, Wiley (2011)

Book manuscripts
At the time of his death, Sobel had been working on several book projects. With the exception of Walls and Vaults, which was published posthumously, all these books remain unpublished, but are available on the archived version of his website.

 No Light Matter: Socrates and Plato on Justice
 Ends and Means: Aristotle on Happiness and Virtue
 The Mystery and The Glory: Immanuel Kant’s Philosophy of Morals
 Good and Gold: a Judgmental History of Metaethics from G. E. Moore through J. L. Mackie
 Words and Symbols, Proofs and Invalidations

References

External links
 Archived copy of Sobel's academic homepage. Includes links to several papers and book manuscripts.

1929 births
2010 deaths
American people of Canadian descent
American philosophers
Atheist philosophers
Canadian philosophers